Julian H. Siegel (born 1966 in Nottingham) is a British jazz saxophone and clarinet player, and a composer and arranger, described by MOJO Magazine as  "One of the UK's most creative saxophonists"

Siegel has toured and recorded with Greg Cohen and Joey Baron and was awarded the BBC Jazz Awards 2007 for Best Instrumentalist.

Siegel won the 2011 London Awards for Art and Performance Jazz. In 2015 won his quartet Partisans (Gene Calderazzo, Phil Robson, Thad Kelly) with the album Swamp the Parliamentary Jazz Awards Jazz Album of the Year.

Discography

without fix groups
Partisans (EFZ, 1997) with Phil Robson 
Close-Up (Sound Recordings, 2002)
As One Does''' (FMR Records, 2018)  with Paul Dunmall, Percy Pursglove, Mark Sanders

with PartisansSourpuss	Babel	BDV 2029	2000		Max	Babel	BDV2553	2005		By Proxy	Babel	BDV 2983	2009		Swamp	Whirlwind Recordings	WR4657	2014Nit de Nit	Whirlwind Recordings	WR4738	2019

with Julian Siegel QuartetUrban Theme Park 2011 with Gene Calderazzo, Liam Noble, Oli HayhurstVista'' 2018 with Gene Calderazzo, Liam Noble, Oli Hayhurst

References

External links
Biography at Siegel's official website
 

Living people
People from Nottingham
1966 births
Alumni of the University of East Anglia
English jazz saxophonists
British male saxophonists
21st-century saxophonists
21st-century British male musicians
British male jazz musicians
Basho Records artists
Whirlwind Recordings artists